Second growth may refer to:

 Secondary forest
 Deuxième cru, the second-highest classification under the Bordeaux Wine Official Classification of 1855